Snitterton is a hamlet in Derbyshire, located in South Darley parish, of some fifteen properties including two working farms and Snitterton Hall, a late 16th century manor house which is Grade 1 listed. There are signs that it was once a larger village. 

In the centre of Snitterton there is a square stone set in the ground with an iron ring; this is an 18th century bullring, used to tether a bull for baiting with dogs.

The parish church is St Mary the Virgin in the Cross Green area of Darley Bridge, located opposite South Darley Church of England Primary School.

See also
Listed buildings in South Darley

References

External links 
South Darley Parish Council
South Darley CE Primary School

History of Derbyshire
Derbyshire Dales